Late Night Horror is a BBC horror series shown in 1968 over six 25-minute episodes.

An anthology of short horror stories, Late Night Horror was cancelled after six episodes due to complaints from viewers, and the majority of the series is now missing from the BBC Archives.

Episodes

Series

Archive status
The master 625 line PAL colour videotapes for all six episodes of Late Night Horror were either erased for reuse or junked soon after the series was repeated in 1970. Only the third episode, "The Corpse Can't Play", exists in the BBC Archives — albeit only in black-and-white.

Until 2016, all six episodes were lost until "The Corpse Can't Play" was returned by Kaleidoscope/British Film Institute in the form of a 16mm black-and-white film telerecording made for overseas sales, but the programme was originally made using 2" 625 line PAL colour videotape. The episode was screened on 16 December 2017 at Missing Believed Wiped. Before the recovery of "The Corpse Can't Play", only the opening titles survived on a BBC Graphics reel. The original TV promo presented by Valentine Dyall was uploaded by Kaleidoscope to their YouTube channel in December 2020.

DVD
It was announced 15 February 2022 on Kaleidoscope's Facebook page that "The Corpse Can't Play" will be released onto DVD with a new HD transfer, restored colour and a book about the series. It was due to be released on 1 April 2022 by Kaleidoscope, but was delayed to 15 May. Kaleidoscope had exclusive rights until 1 September 2022.

References

External links
Late Night Horror at BBC Genome episode list

Late Night Horror at Kaleidoscope
Late Night Horror at The Mausoleum Club
Late Night Horror at Late Night Horror at The Mausoleum Club

1960s British drama television series
1968 British television series debuts
1968 British television series endings
BBC Television shows
British horror fiction television series
English-language television shows
Lost BBC episodes
Television shows set in the United Kingdom